Gaius Pius Esuvius Tetricus (also known as Tetricus II) was the son of Tetricus I, Emperor of the Gallic Empire (270/271-273/274).

In 273, he was raised to the rank of Caesar, with the title of princeps iuventutis, and in January 274 he started his first consulship, together with his father. After the defeat and deposition of his father in the autumn of 274 by the Emperor Aurelian, he and his father appeared as prisoners in Aurelian's triumph, but the emperor spared their lives. According to some sources, Tetricus II also kept his senatorial rank.

References

External links 
 
 Polfer, Michael, "Tetricus II (Caesar 273-274 AD)", De Imperatoribus Romanis

Gallic emperors
Thirty Tyrants (Roman)
3rd-century Romans
3rd-century monarchs in Europe
Imperial Roman consuls
Caesars (heirs apparent)
Tetrarchy
Gallic consuls